John Philip Sabo (1900 – April 26, 1958) was an American football and basketball coach. He was a football player at the University of Illinois in 1918 and 1920. He returned to his alma mater to serve as an assistant coach in both football and basketball. While at Illinois he was the president of the Sigma Pi fraternity chapter and received his degree in 1922. Sabo served as the head men basketball coach at the University of Rochester from 1922 to 1923. In 1934, he became the head basketball coach at the University of Vermont in Burlington, Vermont, a position he held for six seasons. He also served as Vermont's head football coach from 1934 to 1939. He rounded out his career as an assistant football coach at Yale University.

When the United States entered World War II, Sabo completed a training course at United States Naval Academy and was commissioned as a Lieutenant Commander in the United States Navy in 1942.  He was assigned to oversee physical conditioning at one of the navy's training centers.

Head coaching record

Football

Basketball

References

1900 births
1958 deaths
American football ends
Basketball coaches from Indiana
Illinois Fighting Illini football coaches
Illinois Fighting Illini football players
Illinois Fighting Illini men's basketball coaches
Kansas Jayhawks football coaches
People from South Bend, Indiana
Players of American football from Indiana
Rochester Yellowjackets men's basketball coaches
Vermont Catamounts football coaches
Vermont Catamounts men's basketball coaches
Yale Bulldogs football coaches
United States Navy personnel of World War II
United States Navy officers